Les Ottolenghi was the Executive Vice President & Chief Information Officer for Caesars Entertainment Corporation, a role he assumed in January 2016. Ottolenghi was previously the Chief Information Officer at Las Vegas Sands Corporation. He is currently working as CITO at Stride, Inc.

Education
Ottolenghi holds an MBA in Decision Information Analysis from Emory University’s Goizueta School of Business where he received the Robert W. Woodruff Scholarship, the highest award granted by the business school. He received his undergraduate degree from Duke University.

Career
Ottolenghi began his career as an entrepreneur and founded Computer Innovations Corporation out of college. He later grew the start-up to a retail operation that achieved $13.3M in sales in three years. As a result of his efforts in the industry, CIO Magazine listed him among the top 50 CIOs.

Ottolenghi’s’ expertise encompasses cyber security, big data, real time CRM, and consumer-centric mobile applications development. He’s led the IT strategic business planning process at the enterprise level by leveraging TBM and introduced the NIST Cyber Security Framework and IT governance and compliance standards.

Ottolenghi is also reported to have funded, written, promoted, and produced a cyberbullying documentary reviewed by HBO films, CNN, and the U.S. House of Congress and accepted at 38 film festivals.

Sands Corporation
Prior to his role at Caesars, Ottolenghi spent two years at Sands Corporation as Chief Information & Innovation Officer and held both the CIO and CTO roles for the first year. In 18 months, he launched an entirely new IT enterprise that included a modern, scalable IT network and software infrastructure and application architecture to replace unprofitable, siloed legacy systems and a new architecture design that integrated casino gaming, hospitality, and resort retail systems into a unified IT services platform. His efforts drove profitability for virtually every area of the company and resulted in a ten-fold increase in the value of IT investments and multimillion-dollar reduction in capital and operating expenses. Additionally, he reversed an enterprise-wide cyber-threat to protect billions of dollars in assets and virtually eliminated future security breaches.

Plat4M Technologies
Previously, Ottolenghi was the Founder & CIO of Plat4M Technologies where he spent five years creating multi-industry software applications including highly scalable SaaS applications and software for the media, travel, and electronics industries. During this time, he created the strategy, business model, and design for TST, the world’s largest retail travel system and developed and licensed over a dozen leading-edge social media engagement tools.

Intent Media Works
As the CTO and Co-Founder of Intent Media Works, the largest distributor of authorized online music media and entertainment file downloads, Ottolenghi spent four years working on groundbreaking projects including the first platform for providing legal and authorized forms of downloadable media content to consumers that led to the first licensing deals with Pandora and Spotify.

Ottolenghi spent nine years at top travel and hospitality companies Agentware Incorporated, CWT, and Holiday Inn Worldwide developing platforms that revolutionized the industry including the first and most influential search engine for the travel industry which was licensed to Kayak and was later sold to Priceline.com for $1.8 billion.

Recognitions and awards
 Technology Association of Georgia (TAG), Employer of the Year (2012) 
 GA Tech, Employee of the Year (2010 & 2011)
 Distributed Computing Industry Association, Innovator of the Year (2006)
 Runner-up, Technology Person of the Year, Travel Agent Magazine (2002)
 Nominated CIO of the Year 1998, Information Week
 Named Top 100 Most Influential Person’s in Travel Industry, Travel Agent Magazine (1998)
 Named Top 50 Rising Star by Travel Agent Magazine (1997)
 Entrepreneur of the Year, North Carolina (1989)
Business Transformation 150, 2020
Digital Transformation Trailblazer, 2019
CIO 100, 2018
Breakaway CIO, 2018
AI/Data Analytics Innovator, 2018
CIO of the Year, Gaming/Hospitality, 2017/2018

References

American businesspeople
Chief information officers
Goizueta Business School alumni
Duke University alumni
Living people
Year of birth missing (living people)